Shajahan Siraj (1 March 1943 – 14  July 2020) was a Bangladeshi politician who served as the vice chairman of the Bangladesh Nationalist Party (BNP). As a student, he was involved with the Bangladesh Liberation War. He was one of the founders of Jatiya Samajtantrik Dal. He was a member of Jatiya Sangsad representing the Tangail-4 constituency.

Early life
Siraj attended Government Saadat College, where he was twice elected vice president of the student council. He served as the general secretary of the Bangladesh Chhatra League, the student organization of the Awami League, from 1970 to 1972. He was a leader of the Mukti Bahini and one of the leaders of Bangladesh liberation. Siraj was one of the designers of the Bangladesh flag. Siraj read the manifesto of Bangladesh independence on March 3, 1971, in front of millions of people in the presence of Sheikh Mujibur Rahman. He served as the acting General Secretary and also the president of Jatiya Samajtantrik Dal (JSD).

Career
Siraj won election to parliament five times from Tangail-4 constituency. He served as a minister, for the Government of Bangladesh, during 1991 and 2001 BNP's tenure. During his tenure as the environment minister, the use and production of plastic shopping bags (polythene bags) were banned in Bangladesh, 3-stroke scooters were withdrawn from the road, and social tree plantation turned into a movement.

In 2007, arrest warrants were issued for Siraj in connection with thirteen charges of tax evasion. He was sentenced to thirteen years in jail, and his wife three. That conviction was overturned in 2010.

Personal life
Siraj was married to Rabeya Siraj, a women's movement leader, president of the BNP's Dhaka city women's front, and a member of the BNP national executive committee. Together they have a daughter, Sarwat Siraj, and, Rajiv Siraj, a son. Sarwat is a practising advocate at the Bangladesh Supreme Court. Rajiv is a member of board of directors of One Group.

Death 
Siraj died on 14 July 2020 at a hospital in Dhaka after suffering from cancer.

References

Further reading
 
 
 
 
 
 
 

1946 births
2020 deaths
Mukti Bahini personnel
Jatiya Samajtantrik Dal politicians
Bangladesh Nationalist Party politicians
2nd Jatiya Sangsad members
4th Jatiya Sangsad members
5th Jatiya Sangsad members
6th Jatiya Sangsad members
8th Jatiya Sangsad members
Environment, Forest and Climate Change ministers of Bangladesh
Textile ministers of Bangladesh
Deaths from cancer in Bangladesh